Bob Green and Wally Masur were the defending champions, but did not participate this year.

Gary Donnelly and Greg Holmes won the title, defeating Ken Flach and Robert Seguso 7–6, 6–3 in the final.

Seeds

  Ken Flach /  Robert Seguso (final)
  Chip Hooper /  Mike Leach (quarterfinals)
  Brad Pearce /  Christo Steyn (first round)
  Gary Donnelly /  Greg Holmes (champions)

Draw

Draw

External links
 Draw

1987 Livingston Open
1987 Grand Prix (tennis)